Septotrapelia is a genus of lichen-forming fungi in the family Pilocarpaceae. It has four species. It was validly published as a genus in 2007 by lichenologists André Aptroot and Jose-Luis Chaves.

Species
Septotrapelia glauca  – Thailand
Septotrapelia multiseptata  – South Korea
Septotrapelia triseptata 
Septotrapelia usnica  – Galápagos Islands

References

Pilocarpaceae
Lichen genera
Lecanorales genera
Taxa described in 2007
Taxa named by André Aptroot